The LRTA 1100 class is the second-generation class of high-floor light rail vehicles of the Light Rail Transit Authority (LRTA) in Manila, Philippines, which began operation in 1999.

Purchase 
The LRT Line 1 in Metro Manila reached its capacity in the 1990s. As such, expanding the capacity of Line 1 was needed. Initially, 32 cars with identical specifications to the 1000 class trains were planned to be ordered for the 32 two-car trains operating at the time so that each train would consist of three cars. However, with the increasing transport demand, four-car trains were instead ordered. 

On October 18, 1996, Hyundai Precision signed a contract to produce 28 cars (7 sets) for the LRT Line 1. These cars were produced between 1997 and 1998 as its first manufactured light rail vehicle. The capacity extension project was due to traffic congestion and air pollution, which in turn led to an increased demand for public transport in Metro Manila by the LRT Line 1.

The trains were provided by the AML consortium, a consortium consisting of Marubeni Corporation, Adtranz, and ABB.

The capacity expansion project was funded by Japan's official development assistance. The handover ceremony and test-run of the 1100 series LRV was done with former President Joseph Estrada and former Vice-President Gloria Macapagal Arroyo in 1999.

Design 
The 1100 class are the first 6-axle (3-bogie) light rail vehicles with two articulated cars in the entire rolling stock of the LRT Line 1, as its predecessor, the 1000 class, was built to the 8-axle (4-bogie) design with three sections.

Car body
The train car body is made of stainless steel. Each LRV has four sliding pocket-type doors per side. The 1100 class trains are  wider than the 1000 class.

Similar to the 1000 class, the 1100 class have cheatlines of blue and yellow that run through its sides.  The trains also served as a prototype for future LRVs made by Hyundai Precision, which bears resemblance to the trains used in the Adana Metro and the Istanbul T4 Line.

Each light rail vehicle has two roof-mounted air-conditioning units. In total, there are eight air-conditioning units in a four-car train set.

Interior
The trains have longitudinal seating. A wheelchair provision is present near the articulated portion of the intermediate cars.

Mechanical
The bogies are of outside-frame type. Each LRV has three bogies consisting of two motorized bogies at the ends of the LRV and one trailer bogie under the articulation. The primary suspension is a chevron rubber spring, while the secondary suspension is an air suspension, similar to the 1200 class.

Semi-permanent couplers are present in the ends of each light rail vehicle except the driving cab section of the MC car.

Traction
The 1100 class trains are the first Line 1 trains to have an IGBT–VVVF traction control system, with each VVVF inverter driving two 3-phase alternating current, enclosed-type induction motors. The trainset produces a distinct high-pitched acceleration sound that is unique to the Adtranz VVVF controller used, a trait present in the train's derivative models.

The original VVVF controller is supplied by ADtranz, while the new VVVF controller installed during the refurbishment period is supplied by Voith.

The traction equipment in a refurbished train has two Voith EmCon I1000-9AU traction inverters with 350 kVA continuous power in each, two auxiliary inverters, and a VPort IO control unit.

Formation 

Details of the car designations are listed below:
MC - driving head car
M - intermediate car

Operations 
The 1100 class entered service in 1999, which raised the line's capacity by half from a carrying capacity of 18,000 passengers per hour per direction to 27,000 passengers per hour per direction. After 2001, many vehicles left the service owing to problems in operations and maintenance. Although spare parts had been substantially given in 2004, 14 cars remained out-of-service due to the lack thereof as of 2013, including two cars involved in a collision. Most of the spare parts for the trains, including brake parts, were only procurable from ADtranz. There were attempts to procure spare parts, but these attempts failed. This was affected by the acquisition of ADtranz by Bombardier Transportation in 2001 (later acquired by Alstom in 2021). Furthermore, parts in the 1200 class and the 1100 class only share 20% commonality.

In addition, these trainsets are commonly used as "skip trains" or trains meant to target a particular station due to extremely high volume of passengers, especially during rush hours. However, these trainsets now stop at all stations when Metro Manila was placed under General Community Quarantine in June 2020 (and eventually, the alert level system in September 2021) as a response to the COVID-19 pandemic.

The 1100 class trains normally operate in a 4-car configuration. Under special operating conditions, the trains can operate at a 3-car or 2-car configuration.

Refurbishments
Before the rehabilitation of the 1100 class trains, 2 out of the 7 sets remained in service. One of the train units was also involved in a collision as well, causing it to be put out of service due to damaged train body. Rehabilitation was initiated by the Light Rail Manila Corporation in 2018, which aimed to restore the inactive fleet into serviceable conditions and increase the capacity of Line 1. In February 2018, LRMC and Voith signed an agreement to refurbish the said fleet which includes the control devices, traction systems, and automatic diagnostic displays of main circuits. The refurbishment was carried out between 2019 and 2020 and 6 out of 7 sets returned to operation with an extended vehicle life. The remaining unrepaired set is in the Santolan Depot of LRT-2, due to the ongoing expansion of the Line 1 depot.

Incidents 
 Two 1100 class trains, LRVs 1107 and 1120, collided at Baclaran Depot. LRV 1120, however, was subsequently repaired and refurbished in 2019.
 On November 27, 2017, a 1100 class train door malfunctioned after a passenger forcibly opened it at Vito Cruz station, causing the sensor to malfunction. The train continued its journey with the door left open, and a passenger recorded this incident on camera.

See also

 Adana Metro
 T4 (Istanbul Tram)
 LRTA 1000 class
 LRTA 1200 class
 LRTA 13000 class

Notes

References

Further reading 

Manila Light Rail Transit System
Rolling stock of the Philippines
Train-related introductions in 1999
750 V DC multiple units
Hyundai Rotem multiple units
Adtranz multiple units